USA Radio Network is an American mass media company, specializing in long-form spoken word (talk radio) and radio newscasts, produced and distributed with a generally conservative focus.

USA Radio Network produces and distributes 24-hour news, news/talk, information, opinion and talk/entertainment radio programming to approximately 1,100 radio stations around the world on two full-time satellite channels and through various digital protocol systems. 

It has no connection to NBCUniversal Cable's USA Network.

History
USA Radio Network was established in 1985 by Marlin Maddoux. Maddoux had hosted his own local conservative news talk program, Point of View, in Dallas since 1972. In 1982, the program began broadcasting nationwide on the Satellite Radio Network. Maddoux identified the need for a national news service for radio stations not served by the major networks.  The newly chartered USA Radio Network went on the air with its first newscast via satellite on September 15, 1985. Maddoux died on March 4, 2004.

In 2008, USA Radio Network merged its corporate structure under Larry Bates of Memphis, Tennessee, with Information Radio Network, with programming on the two networks remaining separate. The combined company was known as IRN/USA Radio Network.  The old IRN became IRN/USA-1, and the two existing USA Radio Network channels became channels 2 and 3.  IRN/USA Radio Network went into receivership in 2013 due to the legal issues of its sister company First American Monetary Consultants. Cross Platform Media took over day-to-day management of the network under the direction of the courts until Cross Platform purchased it from receivership in September 2014.

Cross Platform Media immediately removed the IRN moniker, shut down all of IRN's programming, and relaunched the original USA Radio Network brand as the first step in an revitalization program that included overhauling USA Radio News and rebuilding its programming lineup. Russ Jones stepped in as Senior Vice President and News Director to oversee the 24-hour news department.

On October 9, 2015, Liftable Media, a company that specializes in digital and social news websites, acquired USA Radio Networks from Cross Platform Media. On October 15, Liftable hired former nationally syndicated conservative talk show host Rusty Humphries as Senior Vice President of Programming.

Nevada Radio, LLC based in Washoe Valley, Nevada, acquired the network in 2018. It then severed ties with Humphries.

Daybreak USA is the station's long-running morning news magazine. The program was replaced by Doug Stephan's Good Day in June 2022.

USA Radio brought Wyatt Cox on board in December 2015 to produce a 24-hour old-time radio Christmas special. Old-time radio broadcasts have been a staple of the network for several years.  Since December 26, 2015, the broadcasts have aired under the umbrella title "Classic Radio Theater."
 Other mainstays of the network include Wayne Allyn Root, and Ron Seggi.

References

Further reading

External links
 

American radio networks
Radio stations established in 1985
1985 establishments in the United States